Carlos Igor Silveira Pita (born 31 May 1989 in Camacha, Madeira) is a Portuguese former footballer who played as a left back.

References

External links

1989 births
Living people
People from Santa Cruz, Madeira
Portuguese footballers
Madeiran footballers
Association football defenders
Primeira Liga players
Liga Portugal 2 players
Segunda Divisão players
C.D. Nacional players
S.C. Beira-Mar players
C.S. Marítimo players
C.F. Os Belenenses players
Cypriot First Division players
Doxa Katokopias FC players
Portugal youth international footballers
Portugal under-21 international footballers
Portuguese expatriate footballers
Expatriate footballers in Cyprus
Portuguese expatriate sportspeople in Cyprus